The discography of English alternative rock band The Verve consists of four studio albums, two compilation albums, two video albums, three extended plays, fourteen singles, two promotional singles and fifteen music videos.

Albums

Studio albums

Compilation albums

Video albums

Extended plays

Singles

Promotional singles

Music videos

References

External links
 Official website
 
 

Discography
Discographies of British artists
Verve, The